Lopata (Czech feminine: Lopatová), or Łopata (Polish), is a Slavic surname. Notable people include:

 Helena Znaniecki Lopata (1925–2003), American sociologist
 Jadwiga Łopata, Polish organic farmer and activist
 Jan Łopata (born 1954), Polish politician
 Jiří Lopata (1936–2021), Czech footballer
 Kacper Łopata (born 2001), Polish footballer
 Stan Lopata (1925–2013), American baseball player
 Vasyl Lopata (born 1941), Ukrainian writer and painter

See also
 
Лопато, a similar Russian surname

Czech-language surnames
Polish-language surnames
Ukrainian-language surnames